Simaba is a genus of flowering plants belonging to the family Simaroubaceae.

Its native range is Costa Rica to Southern Tropical America and Trinidad.

Species
Species:

Simaba guianensis 
Simaba monophylla 
Simaba obovata 
Simaba orinocensis 
Simaba polyphylla

References

Simaroubaceae
Sapindales genera